Assean Lake, is a lake located about 125 kilometers by road north east of the town of Thompson, Manitoba, Canada. The lake is connected via a thin stretch of water to the Little Assean Lake. It lies just northwest of Split Lake.

Overview
Assean Lake lies within the northeastern extension of the Thompson Belt.  The local geology of the Assean Lake consists of an extensive cover of lacustrine clay, silt, sand and basal till up to 20 meters in thickness.

The name of the lake is from the Cree word  ᐊᓯᓃᐊᐧᐣ or asinîwan indicating a place with many stones. It has also been spelled as Asseyan or Assigan.

References

External links 
 

Lakes of Manitoba